Vasaorden is a Swedish royal barge originally constructed in 1774 based on a design by Fredrik Henrik af Chapman. It is used for ceremonies such as state visits and royal weddings.

After the original barge was destroyed in a fire on 8 August 1921, an exact replica was constructed and launched in 1923.

References

1774 ships
1923 ships
Barges
Vehicles of heads of state
Auxiliary ships of the Swedish Navy
Maritime incidents in 1921